Ephrahim Jerry (born 27 May 1996) is a Dutch handball player for Sporting NeLo and the Dutch national team.

He represented the Netherlands at the 2020 European Men's Handball Championship.

References

External links

1996 births
Living people
Dutch male handball players
People from Geldrop
Sportspeople from North Brabant
Expatriate handball players
Dutch expatriate sportspeople in Belgium
21st-century Dutch people